The 1903 Kirksville Osteopaths football team was an American football team that represented the American School of Osteopathy, now known as A.T. Still University, in the 1903 college football season.

Schedule

References

Kirksville Osteopaths
Kirksville Osteopaths football seasons
Kirksville Osteopaths football